Kocatepe is a rapid transit station on the M1 line of the Istanbul Metro. It is located in central Bayrampaşa in the southern part of the neighborhoods Kocatepe. The station is on the north side of the Forum Istanbul Shopping Mall and has direct access to the mall. Kocatepe was opened on 3 September 1989 as part of the first rapid transit line in Istanbul as well as Turkey and is one of the six original stations of the M1 line. The station briefly served as the western terminus of the M1 between September and December 1989 until the line was extended to Esenler.

Layout

References

Railway stations opened in 1989
1989 establishments in Turkey
Istanbul metro stations
Bayrampaşa